Samuel H. Holland was a state senator in Arkansas in 1873 and, for a special session, in 1874 during the Reconstruction era. He also served as a teacher, sheriff, jailer, and principal. He taught at the Howard School, named for Oliver O. Howard, until it was closed by the school board in 1871. The school building was used by the United Sons of Ham, a secret African American benevolent organization. He was involved in the establishment of millage fees to fund area schools.

References

19th-century American politicians
African-American politicians during the Reconstruction Era
Arkansas sheriffs
African-American educators
Educators from Arkansas
Arkansas state senators